Ajit Bhatia (born 11 May 1936) is an Indian former cricketer. He played first-class cricket for Delhi, Rajputana and Uttar Pradesh between 1950 and 1959.

See also
 List of Delhi cricketers

References

External links
 

1936 births
Living people
Indian cricketers
Delhi cricketers
Rajasthan cricketers
Uttar Pradesh cricketers
Place of birth missing (living people)